Luciano Ismael Ferreyra (born 19 February 2002) is an Argentine professional footballer who plays as an left winger for Rosario Central.

Club career
Ferreyra started out with local club Club Olimpo SP, prior to moving to Santa Fe with Rosario Central in 2015. After five years progressing through their youth ranks, Ferreyra moved into first-team football in October 2020. He made his senior debut on 2 November against Godoy Cruz, playing eighty-six minutes before being substituted off for Joaquín Laso in a 2–1 win.

International career
Ferreyra was called up to represent Argentina at the 2019 South American U-17 Championship in Peru. He appeared six times as his country won the trophy. Ferreyra also trained with the senior team at the 2019 Copa América.

Career statistics
.

Honours
Argentina U17
 South American U-17 Championship: 2019

Notes

References

External links

2002 births
Living people
Sportspeople from Chaco Province
Argentine footballers
Argentina youth international footballers
Association football wingers
Rosario Central footballers